Charley George Kendall (born 15 December 2000) is an English professional footballer who plays for Bromley on loan from Lincoln City, as a striker.

Career
Born in Eastbourne, Kendall began his career with Queens Park Rangers, spending five years with the club. He spent time during the 2020–21 season on loan at Eastbourne Borough, before signing permanently in September 2021, having left QPR by mutual consent in August. He moved to Lincoln City in January 2022, returning immediately on loan to Eastbourne until the end of the 2021–22 season.

He scored on his Lincoln debut, in an EFL Cup game on 9 August 2022.

On 30 August 2022, he joined Sutton United on a season-long loan. He was recalled from his loan on 4 January 2023 having played 10 times for Sutton United in all competitions. He joined Bromley on loan for the rest of the season on 26 January 2023.

Career statistics

References

2000 births
Living people
English footballers
Queens Park Rangers F.C. players
Eastbourne Borough F.C. players
Lincoln City F.C. players
Sutton United F.C. players
Bromley F.C. players
National League (English football) players
Association football forwards
English Football League players